Hendrick Mommers (bapt. 2 January 1620, in Amsterdam – buried 21 December 1693, in Amsterdam), was a Dutch Golden Age landscape painter.

Biography
According to Houbraken he was a Haarlem painter of vegetable market scenes, who was the first teacher of the young painter Dirk Maas, who later took lessons from the more famous landscape painter Nicolaes Berchem. Mommers died at the age of 74 in 1697. Houbraken also mentions Mommers in a poem about the Bentvueghels after the painter Dirk Visscher, who was called "Slempop". It is not clear if Houbraken intended to show that he had been Visscher's teacher, if he had shared the "Slempop" nickname, or if he was meant to be connected with another nickname, but Mommers did travel to Italy. Visscher is registered by the RKD as "Slempop" in Rome in 1707, or about the same time Houbraken was writing.

According to the RKD, Mommers became a member of the Haarlem Guild of Saint Luke in 1647, where he was last registered in 1665 when he appears to have moved to Amsterdam. He is registered as a Berchem follower and an Italy traveller (without a nickname). Dirk Maas was his pupil.

References

External links
 Hendrick Mommers on Artnet

1620 births
1693 deaths
Dutch Golden Age painters
Dutch male painters
Dutch landscape painters
Painters from Amsterdam
Painters from Haarlem
Members of the Bentvueghels